High Score is a Netflix docuseries created by France Costrel. It features stories and interviews with the developers and creators of early video games. The series first premiered on August 19, 2020.

Episodes
High Score features interviews and segments around the creation and development of video games in the 1980s and 1990s. These are intermixed with animated segments rendered in a pixel art-style similar to video games of this period. The show's intro sequence is also animated in the pixel style and includes numerous references to past video games, with its theme song by the Australian band Power Glove. The series is narrated by Charles Martinet, who is the voice actor for Mario.

Production
Creator France Costrel said that she was inspired to create the documentary as, growing up in France but having American friends, "[video games] are a universal language". She had worked as the showrunner for "8-Bit Legacy", a video game documentary for Great Big Story, but recognized it only covered a portion of the history of the industry. She developed a pitch for Netflix, getting help from her colleagues from the show Dark Net and Melissa Wood. Costrel had wanted to shift focus away from the games themselves as most video game documentaries, and instead to the developers behind the games and players to give insights into the creativity on video game development. Costrel decided not to try to tell a full history of video games but limit it to overarching and cohesive stories of certain periods in the industry. Costrel and Wood said it made sense to start at the onset of arcade and console games to bookend one side of their story, and opted to end with the transition into 3D computer graphics as it "make a natural ending, a new kind of stepping stone in the history of gaming".

In researching their stories, Costrel said that most of the video game companies were open to working with them to showcase the case, while some of the creators had left the industry and were also ready to share their stories. While Costrel estimated they had material for about twenty hours of content they had to whittle this to the six episodes and focused more on those stories that would be of interest across all types of game players, not just hardcore gamers.

One of the games featured in the series was GayBlade by Ryan Best who had created it in the 1990s. As explained in the show, while moving from Hawaii to California, all his own copies of the game were lost, and could not find any other copies elsewhere, which he had explained to the producers during production. The game was added to the Internet Archive and playable there via emulation after its discovery.

Costrel serves as director along with William Acks, Sam LaCroix, and Melissa Wood; all four along with Courtney Coupe also are the show's executive producers.

Reception
The series was well received by journalists as a well-put-together overview of the early video game period. GameSpot called the series "a crash course on the golden age of gaming filled with insightful interviews, brilliant writing, and most importantly, an inspiring and inclusive message." Slash Film called the series "one of the most sleek and satisfying historical accounts of the early decades of video games, even if it’s not a definitive, comprehensive account of the ups and downs of the industry as a whole." The Hollywood Reporter said "It's far from Netflix's best or most substantive doc — it's often rather superficial and full of gaping holes — but in terms of sheer bingeing ease, with six episodes, none running over 47 minutes, High Score is tough to top. It's light and fun and full of entertaining trivia, with a willingness to go just far enough off the beaten path that some of it will even be new for its core demo."

Ars Technica compared the series favorably in light of its own series of "War Stories" documentaries as a solid look at this era of video games, but noted that High Score has some notable omissions, such as Tetris.

The A.V. Club was more critical of the disjointed narrative provided by the series, though praised the use of interviews with minor figures from the industry's history, saying "These personal and often unexpected stories are easily the highlight of High Score, and they’re occasionally the only thing that saves it from turning into the public school version of a video game history lesson." Slate criticized the series for sidelining some equally important developments such as the Wizardry series alongside Ultima, and for not bringing up modern parallels, such as crunch time in the video gaming industry. The Verge praised the series for presenting underrepresented figures within video games like Heineman, Lawson, and Best but argued that the show presented them as those doing "boundary-pushing work", and failed to show the more realistic conditions of the video game industry of that timeframe and which remained a problem in current state of the video game industry.

Rotten Tomatoes gives the series a 76% aggregate rating from 25 critics.

Notes

References

External links
 
 

2020s American documentary television series
2020 American television series debuts
English-language Netflix original programming
Netflix original documentary television series
Documentary television series about video games